Egīls Tēbelis (born 12 December 1972) is a Latvian hurdler. He competed in the men's 400 metres hurdles at the 1996 Summer Olympics.

References

1972 births
Living people
Athletes (track and field) at the 1996 Summer Olympics
Latvian male hurdlers
Olympic athletes of Latvia
Place of birth missing (living people)